Throughout the years, numerous conservative activists have accused CBS News of perpetuating a liberal bias in its news coverage.

In his 2001 book Bias: A CBS Insider Exposes How the Media Distort the News, former CBS News correspondent Bernard Goldberg extensively criticized Rather's management of CBS News and what he claimed was Rather's combative efforts to skew the network's coverage.

Journalism scandals

1960s 
In 1964, Rep. Jimmy Utt (R-Cal.) filed a libel suit against CBS regarding a CBS Reports "Case History of a Rumor" program. He claimed the defendants had "'entrapped' him into giving a television interview that turned out to be a 'cross examination' by Roger Mudd, who acted as 'prosecutor, judge, and jury.'" The case was dismissed. Utt died in office in 1970 and was succeeded by John G. Schmitz.

On February 15, 1966, CBS News president Fred Friendly resigned in protest after the network declined to show hearings of the Senate Foreign Relations Committee regarding the expanding Vietnam War in favor of reruns of I Love Lucy. The decision, made by the network's vice president of broadcasting, John M. Schneider, specifically related to the testimony of George F. Kennan not being shown, in contrast to NBC News, which was showing it live.

Subsidization of Haitian invasion
In 1971, the FCC and the House Commerce Committee issued reports claiming that CBS News financially subsidized Project Nassau, a planned 1966 invasion of Haiti intended to overthrow then-dictator François Duvalier; CBS News allegedly became involved in the plot in order to shoot the invasion for a television documentary. However, the participants in the invasion were arrested by the FBI before it could be carried out. In a deposition, Atlanta Journal reporter Tom Dunkin claimed that Jay McMullen, a CBS producer, told him that he had "spent a lot of time and money on this project and had nothing to show for it." CBS was denounced by Vice President Spiro Agnew, who accused the network of disseminating "self-serving propaganda."

2004 Killian documents

On September 8, 2004, two months before the 2004 presidential election, 60 Minutes II broadcast a report by Dan Rather claiming that a series of memos had surfaced criticizing President George W. Bush's service record in the Texas Air National Guard, purportedly discovered in the personnel files of Bush's then-commanding officer, Lt. Col. Jerry B. Killian. However, independent analysis of the documents in question—particularly analysis of their anachronistic typographic conventions—strongly suggested that they were actually forgeries.

Despite initially defending the authenticity of the documents, Rather and CBS eventually admitted that they were misled about how they were obtained; Rather, however, has continued to insist that the documents weren't conclusively proved to be forged. After an internal investigation, CBS dismissed four producers and allegedly hastened Rather's retirement as anchor of the CBS Evening News. Rather filed a $70 million lawsuit against CBS in 2007, claiming that the network and its management had made him a "scapegoat" in the Killian story. In 2009, Rather's lawsuit was dismissed.

Plagiarism
On the April 4, 2007, broadcast of the CBS Evening News, Katie Couric gave a one-minute commentary about the importance of reading. However, it was later discovered that Couric's commentary was substantially lifted from a column by Jeffrey Zaslow in The Wall Street Journal. Despite the personal flavor of the piece—with Couric saying how she still remembered receiving her first library card—it was later determined that a producer had written the commentary instead of Couric, and that she had plagiarized from Zaslow's column. CBS quickly fired the producer and promised changes to its procedures.

Benghazi Incident
Steve Kroft, Co-Editor of 60 Minutes, interviewed Barack Obama immediately following the noted Rose Garden press conference held in response to the September 11, 2012 terrorist attack on the US Consulate in Benghazi where Ambassador Christopher Stevens was killed. CBS withheld significant parts of the interview that confirm the President's refusal to acknowledge the attack as a confirmed act of terror despite the prominence that arose following the second presidential debate. CBS quietly released the footage just two days before the 2012 election.

On 10 March 2014, reporter Sharyl Attkisson resigned from CBS News, citing what she saw as the network's liberal bias, an outsized influence by the network's corporate partners, and a lack of dedication to investigative reporting. In her book Stonewalled, Attkisson also reports about how her computer was hacked, deleting stories about the Benghazi attack.

Misrepresentation of 2017 Chicago torture incident
In January 2017, after the events of the 2017 Chicago torture incident took place, CBS Radio News reported, "The viral video of a beating and knife attack in Chicago suggests the assault had racial overtones. CBS's Dean Reynolds tells us the victim is described as a mentally challenged teenager. In the video he is choked and repeatedly called the n-word. His clothes are slashed and he is terrorized with a knife. His alleged captors repeatedly reference Donald Trump." This description was criticized by conservatives,  including Jack Armstrong and Joe Getty at the San Francisco CBS Radio News affiliate KGO (AM).

Misattributed footage of a hospital during the COVID-19 pandemic 
On March 25, 2020, the CBS This Morning news program aired a segment described in a teaser called "Desperation in New York as coronavirus cases there continue to skyrocket", which featured a clip of hospital personnel, equipment, and patients after a short clip featuring Deborah Birx, who was at the time serving as the White House Coronavirus Response Coordinator. However, the footage shown was actually that of a hospital in Bergamo, Italy aired three days earlier by Sky News and not from New York. CBS News later acknowledged the error, with a spokesperson from CBS attributing the error to "an editing mistake." and added that "We took immediate steps to remove it from all platforms and shows." One week later, CBS News used a short clip of the same Italian footage while referencing COVID-19 cases in Pennsylvania.

See also 

 Media bias in the United States

References 

CBS News
Journalism controversies by media organ
Television controversies in the United States
Mass media-related controversies in the United States